Claire Annette Sturgess (born 15 September 1966) is a British disc jockey, and voiceover artist.

Early life
She was born in Salisbury in Wiltshire, where she grew up. She attended Avon Valley College in Durrington, Wiltshire.

Career

BBC Radio 1
She was a presenter on BBC Radio 1 from 1993, after working as a production assistant on the Simon Bates mid-morning show. Firstly, she sat in for Mark Goodier for one week in February 1993 before taking over the Friday Rock Show from Tommy Vance in April that year  as well as the 1-4 AM overnight slot on Sunday nights/Monday mornings. Following Dave Lee Travis's departure in August 1993, she took over the Saturday mid-morning show, (with Nicky Campbell presenting the show on Sundays). Danny Baker took the show in October 1993.

Her Rock Show moved to Sunday afternoon in October 1993, following the restructuring of the station by new controller Matthew Bannister, but it then moved to Sunday Evening just 7 months later in May 1994. She was added to the presenting roster of BBC television music programme Top of the Pops in September 1994 but presented only two episodes before being replaced by Lisa I'Anson.

Sturgess moved to the weekday overnight slot in 1996 and remained there until leaving Radio 1 in July 1997.

XFM
She joined London's Xfm when it launched as a full-time station in September 1997 and left in 2007. As well as hosting her own evening show, she filled in for Karl Pilkington on Ricky Gervais and Stephen Merchant's XFM radio show.

NME Radio
In June 2008, she joined the line-up of the new NME Radio, presenting the breakfast show and her Saturday afternoon show. She is also a continuity announcer for Sky One and Sky Movies.

Absolute Radio
In 2015 Claire Sturgess joined Absolute Radio, taking the 4 - 6pm slots on both Saturdays and Sundays, the latter being a request show. She now presents Fridays 7-10pm (Absolute 80's Greatest Hits), Saturdays 7-10pm (Classic Rock Party) and Sundays 6pm-8pm (Absolute Radio Request Show). She also presents weekdays 10am-1pm on Absolute Classic Rock.

References

External links
 
 Classic Rock Mornings on Absolute Classic Rock
 Friday Night 80s Greatest Hits on Absolute Radio
 Friday Night 80s Greatest Hits on Absolute 80s
 Classic Rock Party on Absolute Radio
 The Classic Rock Party on Absolute Classic Rock
 Absolute Radio Request Show on Absolute Radio

1966 births
Absolute Radio
British radio DJs
British radio personalities
People from Salisbury
Living people